Eugène (Jack) Mottart (29 February 1900 – 1953) was a Belgian rower. He competed in the men's single sculls event at the 1928 Summer Olympics.

References

External links
 

1900 births
1953 deaths
Belgian male rowers
Olympic rowers of Belgium
Rowers at the 1928 Summer Olympics
Place of birth missing